From Chaos to Eternity is the ninth full-length studio album by the Italian symphonic power metal band Rhapsody of Fire. It was released on June 17, 2011 via Nuclear Blast. This is the last album to feature long-time guitarist/songwriter Luca Turilli, bassist Patrice Guers, and session guitarist Dominique Leurquin, who all left the band on good terms in August 2011 to found Luca Turilli's Rhapsody, the last album with Christopher Lee as narrator, and the only album with guitarist Tom Hess.

It is the last album to be based on a fantasy saga until their new album The Eighth Mountain, and the final album in the Algalord Chronicles, a long conceptual storyline originating from the band's 1997 debut, Legendary Tales. Due to Hess leaving the band in 2013 and not being replaced, it is the only album by the band with two guitarists recognized as full-time members.

The song "From Chaos To Eternity" was listed in the top 100 album charts in many countries around the world, such as Japan, Italy, Switzerland, Germany, France and many others.

Track listing

Concept

After Iras had read Erian's Book, he discovered the secret that was threatening the known world from Nekrons 7th Black Book. During one of the final battles between heaven and hell; Thanor the Black Dragon had betrayed Nekron by telling the angels where the son of Kron was hidden from them. When Kron learned of Thanor's betrayal his rage cracked the Earth. Thanor was captured and tortured, but before being killed his eyes had been ripped out of his face. Iras and his companions finally understood. They remembered the stone dragon without eyes guarding Erians book inside the fortress of Har-Kuun, and realized it was indeed Thanor himself.

After the Angels had defeated Nekron they banished him from the world and they took Thanor's eyes and turned them into two precious stones, Aelin and Mornir. Later the Angels scattered the stones across the known world to symbolically spread courage and wisdom in Thanor's name. Despite his dark past, Thanor sacrificed his life, to help the Angels' secure victory. As Iras read on, he also learned that on the day of the seventh eclipse the mystic energies of the eclipse would awaken the seven winged demons of Har-Kuun, who would then open the gates of hell and unleash Nekron from his prison. But Erian's book also revealed, that if on the same day Thanor had gotten his eyes back, the scream of his soul would quake the Earth and that he would be able to rise again to stop Nekron's evil plans. Despite the remaining pages missing due to Tarish's betrayal, what they needed to know for sure had been revealed to them. The two precious stones, Thanor's eyes, had to be found.

After learning of these events, the Wizards of the White Dragons Order decreed that Iras along with his friends who braved the dangers of Har-Kuun had to travel to the borders of the known world to find the two stones. As the seventh eclipse approached, war was sounding on the horizon. The seven winged demons had been awakened and Nekron was released. Iras and his friends had been able to find the 2 stones and returned to Har-Kuun to place them in the empty spaces on Thanor's statue. Thanor had awakened, and rose from the abyss where Nekron had tortured him. After an epic battle, Thanor returned victorious from destroying the seven winged demons and Nekron, and returned to stone.

With Iras and Dargor present, Thanor opened his eyes once again, which were brighter than ever. He chose Dargor to come with him into the afterlife. Dargor being half demon did not understand why he had been chosen, but it was the decision of the gods and angels, because he chose light over darkness despite his past. The Angels deemed him worthy. Dargor's death was only physical, and a new form of life was born. Erian's spirit had embraced Dargor's immortal soul, to become pure divinity, becoming a God of cosmic light, to breathe on the Earth once again.

Personnel 

Rhapsody of Fire
 Fabio Lione – lead vocals
 Luca Turilli – guitar
 Tom Hess – guitar
 Patrice Guers – bass
 Alex Staropoli – keyboards
 Alex Holzwarth – drums

Additional musicians/voice cast
 Dominique Leurquin – guitar
 Christopher Lee – spoken vocals: narrator/The Wizard King, backing vocals
 Toby Eddington – spoken vocals: Iras Algor
 Stash Kirkbride – spoken vocals: Dargor
 Christina Lee – spoken vocals: Lothen
 Marcus d'Amico – spoken vocals: Khaas
 Simon Fielding – spoken vocals: Tarish
 Manuel Staropoli – baroque recorder
 Olaf Reitmeir – classical and acoustic guitars, acoustic bass
 Thomas Rettke, Herbie Langhans, Miro and Robert Huneeke – choir

Production
 Luca Turilli – production, booklet concept, cover concept
 Alex Staropoli – production, orchestral arrangements
 Sascha Paeth – mixing, engineering and editing
 Olaf Reitmeir and Simon Oberender – engineering and editing
 Miro – mastering
 Felipe Machado Franco – cover art, booklet layout, cover concept, photos retouching
 Janina Snatzke and Stephen Jensen – photos
 Nadia Bellir – Christopher Lee's costume design (photo)
 Tanya Seeman – Christopher Lee's costume making (photo)

Charts

References

2011 albums
Rhapsody of Fire albums
Nuclear Blast albums